Deulgaon, commonly known as "Deulgaon Tad" is a village located in Bhokardan taluka of Jalna district, in state of Maharashtra, India.

Demographics
As per 2011 census:
Deulgaon Tad has 253 families residing. The village has population of 1268.
Out of the population of 1268, 618 are males while 650 are females.
Literacy rate of the village is 60.27%.
Average sex ratio of the village is 1052 females to 1000 males. Average sex ratio of Maharashtra state is 929.

Geography, and transport

References

Villages in Jalna district